Worle is a surname. Notable people with the surname include:

Kathrin Wörle-Scheller (born 1984), German tennis player
Len Worle (1889–1948), Australian rules footballer
Tanja Wörle (born 1980), German footballer
Tommy Worle (1885-1917), Australian rules footballer
Thomas Wörle (born 1992), German footballer